The Stalinist repressions in Mongolia (Ikh Khelmegdüülelt, "Great Repression") refers to an 18 month period of heightened political violence and persecution in the Mongolian People's Republic between 1937 and 1939. The repressions were an extension of the Stalinist purges (also known as the Great Purge) unfolding across the Soviet Union around the same time. Soviet NKVD advisors, under the nominal direction of Mongolia's de facto leader Khorloogiin Choibalsan, persecuted thousands of individuals and organizations perceived as threats to the Mongolian revolution and the growing Soviet influence in the country. As in the Soviet Union, methods of repression included torture, show trials, executions, and imprisonment in remote forced labor camps, often in Soviet gulags.  Estimates differ, but anywhere between 20,000 and 35,000 "enemies of the revolution" were executed, a figure representing three to five percent of Mongolia's total population at the time. Victims included those accused of espousing Tibetan Buddhism, pan-Mongolist nationalism, and pro-Japanese sentiment. Buddhist clergy, aristocrats, intelligentsia, political dissidents, and ethnic Buryats and Kazakhs suffered the greatest losses.

Background

Prelude: 1921–1934 
Following the Mongolian Revolution of 1921, infighting within the ruling Mongolian People's Revolutionary Party (MPRP) resulted in several waves of violent political purges, often instigated and aided by Comintern or Soviet agents and government advisors. In August 1922, Dogsomyn Bodoo, the first prime minister of the revolutionary period, and 14 others were executed without trial after confessing under torture by Soviet agents to conspiring to overthrow the government. Two years later Bodoo's chief accuser, Soliin Danzan, was executed during the Third Party Congress for representing "bourgeois interests". In 1928, several prominent MPRP members including Ajvaagiin Danzan, Jamsrangiin Tseveen, Tseren-Ochiryn Dambadorj, and Navaandorjiin Jadambaa, were imprisoned or exiled in a widescale purge of suspected rightwingers as the country launched its "Leftist Period" of more rapid collectivization, land expropriation, and persecution of the Buddhist Church. After those drastic measures resulted in popular uprisings throughout the country in 1932, several of the MPRP's most hard-line leftists including Zolbingiin Shijee, Ölziin Badrakh, and Prime Minister Tsengeltiin Jigjidjav were blamed, officially expelled from the party, and later executed during the Great Repression.

In 1933–34, in what is viewed as a dress rehearsal for the repressions of 1937–1939, MPRP General Secretary Jambyn Lkhümbe and other MPRP elements, particularly Buryat-Mongols, were falsely accused of conspiring with Japanese spies. Over 1,500 people were implicated and 56 were executed. The public hysteria surrounding the Lkhümbe Affair was spurred in part by Japan's invasion of neighboring Manchuria in 1931. To defend against possible Japanese military expansion into the Soviet Far East, Stalin sought to stabilize Mongolia politically by eliminating opposition to the Soviet backed government and securing an agreement to permit the stationing of Red Army troops in the country.

The Great Repression 
Over the next three years, Soviet mentors in the Ministry of Internal Affairs guided Choibalsan in planning and carrying out the impending purges.  Under the direction of his Soviet handler Matvey Petrovich Chopyak, Choibalsan had Internal Affairs Committee rules amended in May 1936 to facilitate the detention of high ranking politicians without first consulting political superiors.  Soon thereafter, 23 high ranking lamas were arrested for participating in a "counter revolutionary center." Following a yearlong trial they were publicly executed in early October 1937.  When Mongolia's Procurator General protested the lamas' prosecution, he too was arrested and then shot.

In August 1937, the 36-year-old Marshal Gelegdorjiin Demid, whose popularity Choibalsan had always resented, died under suspicious circumstances resulting in Choibalsan's promotion to the dual role of sole Commander-in-Chief of the Mongolian military and Minister of Defense.  The following day Choibalsan, as Interior Minister, issued Order 366 which declared that many in Mongolia "had fallen under the influence of Japanese spies and provocateurs."  That same month Stalin, alarmed by Japanese military movements in Manchuria ordered the stationing of 30,000 Red Army troops in Mongolia and had dispatched a large Soviet delegation to Ulaanbaatar under Soviet Deputy NKVD Commissar Mikhail Frinovsky.  Frinovsky, charged with setting in motion the violent purges that he had so effectively carried out in the Soviet Union under NKVD Chief Nikolai Yezhov, delivered a list of 115 counterrevolutionaries and Japanese collaborators to Choibalsan, recommending they be purged. Working through Soviet advisers already embedded within the Ministry of Interior and with a compliant Choibalsan providing symbolic cover, Frinovsky built the purge framework from behind the scenes; producing arrest lists and assembling an Extraordinary Purge Commission, an NKVD style troika (headed by Choibalsan, with Minister of Justice Tserendorj and former MPRP Secretary Dorjjavyn Luvsansharav) that presided over arrest cases, investigations, and show trials involving “lamas, espionage and counterrevolution.”  The arrest of 65 high ranking government officials and intelligentsia on the night of Sept 10, 1937 signaled the launch of the purges in earnest. All were accused of spying for Japan as part of a Genden-Demid plot and most confessed under intense torture. The first show trial was staged at Ulaanbaatar's Central Theater from 18 to 20 October 1937. Of the 14 persons accused, 13, including former prime minister (1921) and chief abbot of the Manzushir Monastery Sambadondogiin Tserendorj, were sentenced to death.

What followed was a spasm of violence that lasted nearly 18 months. Choibalsan's troika approved and carried out the execution of over 18,000 counterrevolutionary lamas. Monks that were not executed were conscripted into the Mongolian armed forces or otherwise forcibly laicized while 746 of the country's monasteries were liquidated.  Thousands more dissident intellectuals, political and government officials labeled "enemies of the revolution," as well as ethnic Buryats and Kazakhs were also rounded up and killed.  Some 25 persons from top positions in the party and government were executed, 187 from the military leadership, 36 of the 51 members of the Central Committee. Following the Russian model, Choibalsan opened gulags in the countryside to imprison dissidents, while others were transported to gulags in the USSR. As the NKVD effectively managed the purge by staging show trials and carrying out executions, a frequently intoxicated Choibalsan was sometimes present during torture and interrogations of suspected counterrevolutionaries, including old friends and comrades.  Choibalsan rubber-stamped NKVD execution orders and at times personally directed executions. He also added names of political enemies to NKVD arrest lists simply to settle old scores. Nevertheless, even when he attempted to spare victims by recommending leniency in certain cases, NKVD officers often overrode his decision.

End of the Great Repression

Racked with stress, Choibalsan spent six months (August 1938 – January 1939) recuperating and consulting with Kliment Voroshilov, Nikolai Yezhov, and Stalin in Moscow and Sochi while NKVD agents and Interior Ministry officials carried on purge operations from Ulaanbaatar.  When he returned to Mongolia, Choibalsan followed Soviet directives and had the highly popular Prime Minister Amar purged. Choibalsan claimed he "had helped anti-government plotters, opposed their arrest, and neglected the defense of the borders.  He betrayed his own country and was a traitor to the revolution." After a coordinated propaganda campaign, Amar was arrested on 7 March 1939 and sent to the USSR, where he was later tried by a Soviet Troika and executed.

With Amar's removal, Choibalsan became Mongolia's uncontested leader, simultaneously holding the office Prime Minister, Minister for Internal Affairs, Minister of War, and Commander in Chief of the Mongolian armed forces.  Secured in his position, Choibalsan brought the terror to an end in April 1939 by declaring that the excesses of the purges had been conducted by overzealous party officials while he was away in the USSR, but that he had overseen the arrests of the real criminals.  Official blame for the purges fell on the deputy minister of internal affairs Nasantogtoh, and his former Soviet handler Kichikov.  Later, other henchmen of the purge were arrested and executed, including Luvsansharav, Bayasgalan, Dashtseveg, and Luvsandorj.  Dansranbilegiin Dogsom and Darizavyn Losol, the last two living members (besides Choibalsan himself) of the original seven founding members of the MPRP, were also arrested. Dogsom was executed in 1941.  Losol died in a Soviet prison before his case came to trial.

Legacy 

By the time the purges ended in early 1939, an entire stratum of Mongolian society had effectively been exterminated while much of Mongolia's cultural heritage lay in ruins. Approximately 18,000 lamas were condemned to death while thousands more were forcibly laicized and conscripted into the Mongolian army. More than 700 Buddhist monasteries were destroyed.  The old guard revolutionary class, viewed as heavily nationalist, was eliminated; twenty five persons from top positions in the party and government were executed (including former prime ministers Peljidiin Genden and Anandyn Amar), 187 from the military leadership, and 36 of the 51 members of the Central Committee. Choibalsan became Mongolia's unquestioned leader backed by Soviet advisors, a growing Red Army presence in the country, and by younger apparatchiks who were more closely aligned with the Soviet Union, such as future leader Yumjaagiin Tsedenbal.

In the 50 years following the repressions, any public discourse on the matter was discouraged or condemned. At the time of his death in 1952, Choibalsan was widely mourned as a hero, a patriot, and ultimately a martyr for the cause of Mongolian independence. Remnants of his strong personality cult, as well as successful efforts by his successor Tsendenbal to obstruct "de-Stalinization" efforts that could have shed light on the purges, helped solidify the positive regard many Mongolians held of their former leader.  Some scholars have suggested the inclination of Mongolians to avoid blaming Choibalsan for the purges is in effect an attempt to exonerate themselves for what happened. Public anger over the violence of the purges falls predominantly on the Soviet Union and the NKVD, with Choibalsan viewed sympathetically (if not pathetically) as a puppet with little choice but to follow Moscow's instructions or else meet the fate of his predecessors Genden and Amar.

With the end of communist rule in 1990, however, re-examination of the Socialist Era, and particularly the Great Repression, has occurred and there does seem to be an attempt by some Mongolians to come to terms the country's past in a more general context.  In 1991 mass graves of monks executed during the repressions were uncovered near Mörön, and in 2003 in Ulaanbaatar. The corpses of hundreds of executed lamas and civilians were unearthed, all killed with a single shot to the base of the skull. At the same time, there have been concerted efforts by various groups to restore many of the temples and monasteries that were destroyed during the purges.

Notable victims
 
 Peljidiin Genden, Mongolian head of state from 1924 to 1927 and prime minister of Mongolia from 1932 to 1936
 Anandyn Amar, prime minister of Mongolia from 1928 to 1930 and 1936 to 1939, Mongolian head of state from 1932 to 1936
 Darizavyn Losol
 Gelegdorjiin Demid
Dansranbilegiin Dogsom, Mongolian head of state from 1936 to 1939
Sambadondogiin Tserendorj, prime minister of Mongolia, 1921, chief abbot of Manjusri Monastery
Shirnengiin Ayuush
Ölziitiin Badrakh
Jamtsangiin Damdinsüren, Mongolian head of state from 1927 to 1929
Khas-Ochiryn Luvsandorj
Losolyn Laagan, Mongolian head of state from 1930 to 1932
Dorjjavyn Luvsansharav
Tserendondovyn Navaanneren, 20th and last Setsen Khan
Genepil, last Queen
Zolbingiin Shijee
Banzarjavyn Baasanjav MPRP leader from 1936 to 1940

Buryats
A number of prominent Buryats connected to Mongolia were imprisoned and killed during the purges in the Soviet Union, among them:
 Jamsrangiin Tseveen
 Rinchingiin Elbegdorj
 Dash Sampilon
 Erdene Batkhaan

See also
Katyn Massacre
 Khorloogiin Choibalsan
 Mongolian People's Republic
 Great Purge
 1932 armed uprising (Mongolia)
 Cultural Revolution
 Mass killings under communist regimes

References

External links
 Prelude to Violence: Show trials and state power in 1930s Mongolia by Christopher Kaplonski
 A Forgotten Purge by Timothy May, Department of History, University of Wisconsin–Madison
 The Day of Commemoration, 2011, Ulaanbaatar, Mongolia

1930s disasters in Mongolia
20th-century conflicts
20th-century mass murder in Asia
Buddhism in Mongolia
Human rights abuses in Mongolia
Man-made disasters in Mongolia
Mass killings by communist regimes
Mass murder in 1937
Mass murder in 1938
Mass murder in 1939
Mongolia–Soviet Union relations
Mongolian People's Republic
Persecution of Buddhists
Persecution of Mongols
Political history of Mongolia
Politicides
Violence in Mongolia